Crystal Hill is an unincorporated community in Halifax County, Virginia, United States. Crystal Hill has a post office with ZIP code 24539, which opened on March 6, 1879.

References

Unincorporated communities in Halifax County, Virginia
Unincorporated communities in Virginia